In algebra, a generalized Cohen–Macaulay ring is a commutative Noetherian local ring  of Krull dimension d > 0 that satisfies any of the following equivalent conditions:
For each integer , the length of the i-th local cohomology of A is finite:
.

The last condition implies that the localization  is Cohen–Macaulay for each prime ideal .

A standard example is the local ring at the vertex of an affine cone over a smooth projective variety.

References 

 
 

Ring theory